Durham House may refer to:

in England
Durham House (London)

in the United States (by state)
W. W. Durham House, Durham, California, listed on the National Register of Historic Places in Butte County, California
Durham-Shores House, Dupont Station, Delaware, listed on the National Register of Historic Places in Kent County, Delaware
Durham Homeplace, Watkinsville, Georgia, listed on the National Register of Historic Places in Oconee County, Georgia
Durham House (Danville, Kentucky), listed on the National Register of Historic Places in Boyle County, Kentucky
Durham-Perry Farmstead, Bourbonnais, Illinois, listed on the National Register of Historic Places in Kankakee County, Illinois 
Durham House (Goshen, New Hampshire), listed on the National Register of Historic Places in Sullivan County, New Hampshire
Smith-Williams-Durham Boarding House, Hendersonville, North Carolina, listed on the National Register of Historic Places in Henderson County, North Carolina
Durham-Jacobs House, Portland, Oregon, listed on the National Register of Historic Places in Southwest Portland, Oregon
Colvin-Fant-Durham Farm Complex, Chester, South Carolina, listed on the National Register of Historic Places in Chester County, South Carolina
Jay L. Durham House, Houston, Texas, listed on the National Register of Historic Places in Harris County, Texas
E. A. Durham House, Sistersville, West Virginia, listed on the National Register of Historic Places in Tyler County, West Virginia